WJXA (92.9 FM) is an adult contemporary radio station. Licensed to Nashville, Tennessee, United States, the station serves the Nashville, Bowling Green, Clarksville-Hopkinsville areas. The station is currently owned by Duey Wright, through licensee Midwest Communications, Inc.  Its studios are located in south central Nashville near the Tennessee State Fairgrounds and the transmitter site is located in the far western portion of Nashville.

History
After more than a decade of technical and legal wrangling, the station went on the air in 1976 as easy-listening WZEZ; in 1994, the station call letters changed to WJXA. The station has, for a number of years now, adhered to a "light rock" (or adult contemporary) format aimed primarily at female listeners. It features a mixture of current hits with some tracks from fairly recent years.  As of December 2013 the station is, by a factor of two, the most-listened-to radio station in the Nashville market.

It was announced on May 28, 2014, that Midwest Communications would purchase nine of the 10 stations owned by South Central Communications, including WJXA and sister station WCJK. With this purchase, Midwest Communications would expand its portfolio of stations to Evansville, Indiana, Knoxville and Nashville. The sale was finalized on September 2, 2014, at a price of $72 million.

See also
 List of Nashville media

References

External links

JXA
JXA
Midwest Communications radio stations
Mainstream adult contemporary radio stations in the United States
Radio stations established in 1976
1976 establishments in Tennessee